John Buckner Crawford (born January 17, 1960) is an American singer-songwriter known for co-founding the pop group Berlin, which scored several hit songs in the 1980s. Crawford's career as a musician began in junior high after breaking his leg during a basketball game. In an attempt to fight off the boredom of being injured, he picked up a guitar and began taking lessons at a musical instrument retailer in nearby Fullerton, California, where his teacher put him in touch with future Berlin band members Dan Van Patten, Chris Velasco, and Tyson Cobb. John attended El Dorado High School in Placentia, California.

The three soon formed a band named The Toys, with vocalist Ty Cobb at the helm. Crawford, Cobb, and the others were influenced by then-current punk rockers like the Sex Pistols and Synthpop band Ultravox, though Crawford has cited KISS as an early influence as well.

After a name change to Berlin, the band stayed together for about three years. After Cobb left the group, a string of vocalists attempted to fill his spot. In 1980, Berlin released the EP Information on Zone H. Records with Virginia Macolino fronting the group. The band signed to I.R.S. Records briefly in 1980, releasing the single "A Matter of Time", before suddenly disbanding in 1981.

Hiatus 
With Berlin on indefinite hiatus, Crawford worked with another Orange County–based band, The Videos, with Craig Sibley on vocals and guitar, Rich West on keyboards, Ken Dudley on guitars, and John Benson on drums. He also worked as a vocalist for Fahrenheit, a synthesizer pop quartet in the order of Depeche Mode and Ultravox, for which he also played occasional bass and acoustic guitar. Along with Van Patten as synthesist and drum machine programmer, Fahrenheit included West (later of Stacey Q’s band) and Keith Walsh, both on synths as well.

Sometime around the formation of Fahrenheit in late 1981, the Los Angeles-based independent label M.A.O. Records released a new Berlin single, featuring the songs "The Metro" and "Tell Me Why", with Terri Nunn on vocals. It wasn't until 1982's platinum-selling Pleasure Victim that Crawford's music gained an audience. Crawford had a hand in penning all of the disc's songs except for "Masquerade," a song written by guitarist and original Berlin member Chris Ruiz-Velasco.

Rising star 
After Pleasure Victim's initial success on the independent Enigma label, a bidding war ensued, with Geffen's eventually offering the band and their British expatriate manager, Perry Watts-Russell, the most attractive offer to release the record to a wider audience. The disc, recorded on modest equipment at the Casbah recording studio in Fullerton, California for around $3,000, included the controversial hit single Sex (I’m A) as well as Masquerade and The Metro.

The Guitarist Ric Olsen and keyboardist/guitarist David Diamond joined the others in helping to create the synth-driven sound of early 1980s techno pop. The follow-up to Pleasure Victim, titled Love Life, went gold in 1984, thanks in part to the hit single No More Words.

Personnel changes continued to plague the band, with only Nunn and Crawford remaining from the Pleasure Victim lineup as they went into their third album, titled Count Three and Pray, released in 1986.

The commercial centerpiece of Count Three and Pray turned out to be Take My Breath Away, the chart-topping single written by Giorgio Moroder featured in the film Top Gun.

Count Three and Pray was produced by Bob Ezrin (producer of many rock superstars including Kiss, Pink Floyd, Peter Gabriel, Lou Reed and Alice Cooper) and features guest appearances by a host of others, including Dave Gilmour of Pink Floyd, Ted Nugent, and Elliott Easton of The Cars. The majority of the album is characterized by an aggressive, guitar-driven hard rock sound.

End of "the Berlin Era" 
Due to artistic differences between Crawford and Nunn, Berlin disbanded once again, and the disillusioned Crawford created the band The Big F. "The Big F was a chance for Rob (Rob Brill, Berlin and Big F drummer) and I to say, look, okay, we saw what that was and we’re going to try actually now to really focus on just making music, and let the rest of the stuff go away," Crawford said during a 2005 telephone interview.

With Crawford on bass and vocals, The Big F's self-titled debut album for Elektra in 1988 represented a kind of experiment in anti-commercialism, with its dark themes and aggressive hard rock sound. Before courting the attention of record labels, Crawford and Brill deliberately concealed their identities to avoid any association with Berlin. Crawford took on the name John Shreve, and Brill became Rob Donin. Mark Christian rounded out the trio in his role as guitarist. They contributed a cover version of the MC5 song "Kick Out the Jams" to the 1990 Elektra compilation Rubáiyát.

The Big F's second album Is was released on Chrysalis in 1993, and like the first, failed to find a large audience. For the Is tour, the band hired a bassist, allowing Crawford/Shreve to concentrate solely on vocals. In 1995, The Big F called it quits.

Christianity 
Following a short-lived attempt at reuniting Berlin with Nunn, Crawford took a step away from the music industry to focus on his family and sort out the aftermath of his success. It was 10 years before he performed again or wrote another note of music. In the early 1990s, Crawford took a leap of faith and became a born-again Christian, an act that he credits with saving not only his soul but his marriage to Jacquelyn, with whom he had three children, Paul, Sydney, and Samantha.

In 2003 the members of Berlin's (roughly) pre-Love Life era lineup got together at the behest of VH1’s Bands Reunited show, resulting in phone conversations between Crawford and Diamond that Crawford credits with inspiring him to begin writing again.

"I have to kind of give credit to David Diamond," Crawford said in late 2005. I just had a lot of fun talking to him about music. I talked to him on the phone a little bit afterwards, and it just kind of perked me up a little bit. I just decided to try it, just to write some stuff for myself, just to see what it was like."

The resulting self-released album, Surrender, represents 12 tracks of Crawford's songwriting and vocals, emphasizing his newfound faith, along with his precise guitar and bass playing and drum programming.

Surrender features guest appearances by former Big F bandmate Mark Christian and was co-produced by former Stacey Q bandleader Jon St. James. The album was recorded at Crawford's home studio with additional recording and mixing done at St. James’ studio.

During his tenure as Berlin's main songwriter, Crawford wrote most of his songs using an acoustic guitar, though these days his main composing tools are his personal computer and a music application called Reason,produced by Propellerhead Software.

Surrender was available from Crawford's website, where he frequently posts in his public journal about his life as a musician and his conversion to Christianity.

An album of new material titled 8 Days was released in August 2006, and Crawford is reportedly working on a new album of material to be called Tarantula that he says is closer to Berlin's early 1980s sound than anything he's released in the past 20 years. According to Crawford's posts on his message board, due to the financial expense involved in self-releasing his two solo CDs, he may offer MP3 downloads of this new electronic music, song by song, as he completes them. Also on his website, Crawford has hinted that he is open to the idea of playing Christian praise and worship music.

Discography

Berlin
Information (1980)
Pleasure Victim (1982) 
Love Life (1984)
Count Three & Pray (1986)
Transcendance (2019)
Strings Attached (2020)

The Big F 
<small>(As John Shreve) (lead vocalist, bassist, songwriter)</small>The Big F (1989)Patience Peregrine (EP) (1993)Is (1993)

As solo artistSurrender (2005)8 Days'' (2006)
"After Berlin" (2015)

References

American rock guitarists
American male guitarists
American new wave musicians
1960 births
Living people
Berlin (band) members
20th-century American guitarists
20th-century American male musicians